Lindsey Grayzel (also credited as Lindsey Goodwin-Grayzel) is a documentary filmmaker from Portland, Oregon. She started as an editor in 1994 then became producer and director in 1999.

While filming for her documentary The Reluctant Radical, she was arrested and charged with criminal sabotage and other felonies while filming a protest break-in at the Trans Mountain Pipeline in Skagit County, Washington in October 2016, the same day as another filmmaker was arrested at a Keystone Pipeline site in Pembina County, North Dakota. According to The Guardian and Filmmaker magazine, Grayzel was outside a fenced area filming the protest inside a no-trespassing area. Filmmaker also reported that Grayzel was subjected to a strip search before being jailed. Charges against Grayzel were dropped the next month.

Personal life
Abraham and Lindsey Grayzel (nee Goodwin) married in 1996. Their son  is also a filmmaker. He produced Northwest Trees in 2015 while a student at Cleveland High School in Portland.

Filmography
Inside Iraq: The Untold Stories (2004) (editor) 
Dark Water Rising: Survival Stories of Hurricane Katrina Animal Rescues (2006) (2006) (editor)
Switch: A Community in Transition (2009) (editor)  
Lessons from Iraq (2010) (editor) 
Understanding Suicide, Supporting Children (2011) (producer/director) 
Supporting the grieving child (2012) 
The journey : a story of healing and hope (2014) 
Supporting the grieving student (2014) 
ná·qc tımíne wısí·x: Of One Heart (2014) (editor) for Nez Perce National Historical Park 
Where Ice and Ocean Meet (2015) (editor), the first documentary made for Kenai Fjords National Park
Family Journeys (2015)  
Life journeys : reclaiming life after loss (2016) 
Under Pressure, Lake Mead Intake No. 3
Circle of Life (editor)
Local Control for Healthy Communities
Portland's Big Pipe (East Side Big Pipe)
Health Records
The reluctant radical : civil disobedience to fight climate change (2019)

Television
Oregon Art Beat segments "Leslie Lee", "Glass Artist Tim Chilina", "Dennis Meiners" (producer)

References

External links

Living people
Filmmakers from Portland, Oregon
Year of birth missing (living people)
Place of birth missing (living people)
American documentary filmmakers